The Project 664 (NATO reporting name Wisla) class were Polish torpedo boats, designed in Poland in the 1970s. They were one of the few vessels of this size, powered by a gas turbine, and could achieve a great speed.

Development 
In the late 1950s the Polish Navy decided to develop fast torpedo boats of own design, to supplement Soviet-origin project 183 (P-6) class torpedo boats. It was decided to use a gas turbine for propulsion and arm them with four torpedo tubes. Due to lack of previous experience in designing such craft, development was very long. In order to test the technology, a single experimental project 663D torpedo boat was built, ORP Błyskawiczny. Her building started in 1961 and she entered service in 1965. Trials revealed some faults, and further development work was carried out. The result were the boats of the final project 664. They shared a similar silhouette, hull shape and a propulsion fit of 4 diesel and a TM-1 gas turbine engine in a CODAG arrangement. The gas turbine itself was an adaptation of a licence-built Klimov VK-1 aircraft jet engine. The gas turbine being used at speeds above 12 knots.
 
From 1968, eight boats were built in Stocznia Północna (Northern Shipyard) in Gdańsk. They were given numbers from KTD-452 to KTD-459 (an abbreviation of kuter torpedowy duży - "torpedo boat, large") and names.

Service
The boats entered service in the Polish Navy in 1971–1972, and were assigned to the 3rd Navy Flotilla (along with ORP Błyskawiczny).

The design was overall not successful. First of all, the hulls, made of hydronalium (aluminium alloy), had limited durability, especially when sailing at high speed on a rough sea, resulting in cracks. Propulsion was also not optimal, the gas turbine was not fuel efficient limiting range, and there were problems with the gearing of paired engines. The boats were very compact, and were not comfortable for the crews, being cramped, noisy and prone to vibration. Their advantage of very high top speed, was however limited by sea conditions.

Due to service problems and wear, project 664 class boats were relatively quickly phased out in the 1980s, after only 9 to 14 years of service.

The only one preserved was ORP Odważny - in 1990 it was given to the White Eagle Museum in Skarżysko-Kamienna. Its original twin 30 mm AK-230 gun is however replaced with twin 25 mm 2M-3M gun.

List of boats

References

 Teodor Makowski, Robert Rochowicz: Polskie kutry torpedowe - jednostki seryjne in: Morze, Statki i Okręty nr 2/2006 (Polish language)

Torpedo boat classes
Torpedo boats of the Polish Navy
Torpedo boats of the Cold War